Cody William Cameron (born October 12, 1970) is an American voice actor, film director and storyboard artist best known for directing Cloudy with a Chance of Meatballs 2. He voiced many animated characters, including Pinocchio and the Three Little Pigs in the Shrek series and Mr. Weenie in the Open Season franchise.

Career
Cameron started his career at DreamWorks Animation writing dialogue and storyboarding for the Shrek franchise, Shark Tale and Madagascar.

In 2004, Cameron left DreamWorks to join Sony Pictures Animation. He worked there as a storyboard artist on Surf's Up and wrote and directed a short film The ChubbChubbs Save Xmas, a sequel to The ChubbChubbs!. Cameron also voiced Mr. Weenie in the Open Season franchise and directed Open Season 3. In 2013, he co-directed with Kris Pearn his first theatrical feature film Cloudy with a Chance of Meatballs 2.

Filmography

Film

References

External links
 

1970 births
Living people
American animators
American male screenwriters
American film directors
American film producers
American animated film directors
American animated film producers
American male television actors
American male writers
American male voice actors
American male film actors
American male video game actors
Place of birth missing (living people)
21st-century American male actors
American storyboard artists
DreamWorks Animation people
Sony Pictures Animation people